Podochileae is an orchid tribe in the subfamily Epidendroideae.

Genera
Genera:
Aeridostachya (Hook.f.) Brieger
Appendicula Blume
Ascidieria Seidenf.
Bambuseria Schuit., Y.P.Ng & H.A.Pedersen
Bryobium Lindl.
Callostylis Blume
Campanulorchis Brieger
Ceratostylis Blume
Cryptochilus Wall.
Cylindrolobus Blume
Dendrolirium Blume
Dilochiopsis (Hook.f.) Brieger
Epiblastus Schltr.
Eria Lindl.
Mediocalcar J.J.Sm.
Mycaranthes Blume
Octarrhena Thwaites
Oxystophyllum Blume
Phreatia Lindl.
Pinalia Buch.-Ham. ex Lindl.
Poaephyllum Ridl.
Podochilus Blume
Porpax Lindl.
Pseuderia Schltr.
Ridleyella Schltr.
Strongyleria (Pfitzer) Schuit., Y.P.Ng & H.A.Pedersen
Thelasis Blume
Trichotosia Blume

See also
 Taxonomy of the Orchidaceae

References

External links

 
Epidendroideae tribes